The 4th Rocket Division was a division of the Soviet and Russian Strategic Rocket Forces.

It was established in May 1960 in Nerchinsk, Chita Oblast as the 119th Missile Brigade, from the 116th Artillery Brigade. Later redesignated as a Rocket Division.

Initially under the 57th Artillery Range Administration, it became part of the 8th Independent Missile Corps in March 1961, and in 1965 moved its headquarters to Gorny (Drovyanaya) in Chita Oblast. In June 1970 it became part of the 53rd Rocket Army.

In October 1961 it gained the honorific 'Harbin', drawn from the 46th Tank Division, originally the 300th Rifle Division (II).

In 1988-9 it gave up its last RSD-10 Pioneer mobile ICBMs, and by 1990 it had 50 UR-100K silos divided among five regiments.

In 1995 it reportedly had two regiments each with nine RT-2PM Topol missiles.

It was finally disbanded in October 2002.

References

Rocket divisions of the Soviet Union
Rocket divisions of Russia
Military units and formations established in 1960